Kuria Constituency is a former electoral constituency in Kenya. It was the only constituency in the former Kuria District. The constituency had 21 wards, all electing councillors to the Kehancha municipality. It has since been divided into Kuria West Constituency and Kuria East Constituency.

Members of Parliament

Wards

References 

Migori County
Kuria District
Constituencies in Nyanza Province
Former constituencies of Kenya